Pentir Rhiw railway station (alternatively, Pant-y-rhiw railway station) was a station adjacent to Talybont Reservoir in Powys, Wales. The station was opened in 1909 and closed in 1962. Pentir Rhiw had its own signal box. The station building is now a Royal Navy outdoor training centre.

References

Further reading

Disused railway stations in Powys
Former Brecon and Merthyr Tydfil Junction Railway stations
Railway stations in Great Britain opened in 1909
Railway stations in Great Britain closed in 1962